Bernard Louis Carnevale (October 30, 1915 – March 25, 2008) was an American basketball coach and college athletic administrator.  He served as the head basketball coach at the University of North Carolina at Chapel Hill from 1944 to 1946 and the United States Naval Academy from 1946 to 1966, compiling a career college basketball coaching record of 309–171.  Carnevale was the athletic director at the College of William & Mary from 1972 to 1981.  He was inducted into the Naismith Memorial Basketball Hall of Fame in 1970.

Early years
Born in Raritan, New Jersey, Carnevale was a graduate of Somerville High School in Somerville, New Jersey. He graduated from New York University, where he was a member of the 1935 national championship team and played in the first National Invitation Tournament in 1938. While at NYU he was coached by the legendary Howard Cann. He served as a Navy officer during World War II, receiving the Purple Heart.

Career
Carnevale was the head basketball coach at the University of North Carolina at Chapel Hill from 1944 to 1946.  While coaching at UNC, he led the team to their first appearance in the title game.  The Tar Heels lost the game to Oklahoma A&M (now Oklahoma State), who won their second national crown under legendary coach Henry Iba.

Carnevale then moved to Navy between 1946 and 1966, compiling a 257–160 record despite the Naval Academy height restrictions, at that time 6'5" (1.96 m). Carnevale was inducted into the Naismith Memorial Basketball Hall of Fame in 1970.

Personal life
At the time of his death, Carnevale was living in Williamsburg, Virginia. His son, Mark, is a professional golfer, who has won on the PGA Tour and Nationwide Tour.

Head coaching record

See also

 List of NCAA Division I Men's Final Four appearances by coach

References

External links
 

1915 births
2008 deaths
American men's basketball coaches
American men's basketball players
United States Navy personnel of World War II
Basketball coaches from New Jersey
Basketball players from New Jersey
College men's basketball head coaches in the United States
Naismith Memorial Basketball Hall of Fame inductees
National Collegiate Basketball Hall of Fame inductees
Navy Midshipmen men's basketball coaches
North Carolina Tar Heels men's basketball coaches
NYU Violets men's basketball players
People from Raritan, New Jersey
Somerville High School (New Jersey) alumni
Sportspeople from Somerville, New Jersey
Sportspeople from Williamsburg, Virginia
United States Navy officers
William & Mary Tribe athletic directors